The star-throated antwren (Rhopias gularis) is an insectivorous bird in the antbird family Thamnophilidae. It is endemic to the Atlantic Forest region of southeast Brazil. Its natural habitats are subtropical or tropical moist lowland forest and subtropical or tropical moist montane forest.

Taxonomy
The star-throated antwren was described and illustrated by the German naturalist Johann Baptist von Spix in 1825 and given the binomial name Thamnophilus gularis. It was subsequently placed with the "stipple-throated group" in the genus Myrmotherula. When a morphological and genetic analysis published in 2012 found that the star-throated antwren was not closely related to other species in Myrmotherula it was moved to the monotypic genus Rhopias which had originally been erected by the German ornithologists Jean Cabanis and Ferdinand Heine in 1860. The type species is the star-throated antwren. The name of the genus comes from the Ancient Greek word rhōps meaning "bush".

Description
The forehead is greyish. The wing-coverts are black-brown with two buff bars. The throat is black with white spots. The breast and belly are grey. The female is similar in appearance to the male but has a rufous-brown forehead and larger spots on the throat.

Distribution and habitat
The range extends from the southern coastal area of Bahia to the north-eastern corner of Rio Grande do Sul.

Behaviour

Breeding
It is built from fine rootlets, fungal fibers and pieces of dried leaves. The clutch is invariably two eggs. These have a white background covered with reddish-brown spots and blotches. The eggs are incubated by both parents and hatch after around 17 days. The nestlings are cared for both parents and fledge after 11 days.

References

External links

Xeno-canto: audio recordings of the Star-throated Antwren

star-throated antwren
Birds of the Atlantic Forest
Endemic birds of Brazil
star-throated antwren
star-throated antwren
Taxonomy articles created by Polbot